Saint-Léonard—Montréal-Nord station is a commuter rail station operated by Exo on the boundary between the boroughs of Saint-Léonard and Montréal-Nord in Montreal, Quebec, Canada. It is served by the Mascouche line.

The station is located immediately southwest of Boulevard Lacordaire south of Boulevard Industriel. The station, built at grade, possesses two low-level side platforms: platform 1 on the north side and platform 2, which is shorter, on the south side. Most trains use platform 1. Both platforms are wheelchair accessible and feature raised wheelchair platforms with ramps to provide access to the trains.

The station has two buildings. One, located at the northeastern end of the station on Boulevard Lacordaire, provides elevator access to platform 1, as well as adjacent outdoor stairs (Boulevard Lacordaire is built in a cutting and passes under the tracks at this point). The second is an enclosed overhead walkway passing over the tracks, providing stair and elevator access between the platforms and connecting to the station's main parking lot to the south. Platform 2 also opens onto this parking lot via a walkway, and another walkway connects the southwest end of platform 1 with a park-and-ride lot north of the station on Avenue Jean-Meunier.

A mural by Sylvain Bouthillette entitled Flux is located on the exterior walls of the Boulevard Lacordaire headhouse.

Connecting bus routes

References

External links 
  Saint-Léonard–Montréal-Nord Commuter Train Station Information (RTM)
  Saint-Léonard–Montréal-Nord Commuter Train Station Schedule (RTM)
 2016 STM System Map

Exo commuter rail stations
Saint-Leonard, Quebec
Montréal-Nord
Railway stations in Quebec